A Matter of Time or Matter of Time may refer to:

Books

 A Matter of Time: an Archaeological Survey of the River Gravels of England, a 1960 monograph by Collin Bowen
 A Matter of Time, novel by Jessamyn West 1966 
 A Matter of Time (Cook novel), a 1985 sci-fi novel by Glen Cook
 A Matter of Time (Deshpande novel), a 1996 novel by Shashi Deshpande

Film and TV
 A Matter of Time (film), a 1976 film starring Ingrid Bergman and Liza Minnelli
A Matter of Time, a 2016 documentary film about Kathryn Calder directed by Casey Cohen
 "A Matter of Time" (Stargate SG-1), an episode of the second season of Stargate SG-1
 "A Matter of Time" (Star Trek: The Next Generation), a 1991 episode of the fifth season of Star Trek: The Next Generation

Music 
 A Matter of Time (Hilltop Hoods album), 1999
 A Matter of Time (Jason Sellers album), 1999, or its title track
 A Matter of Time (mixtape), a 2009 mixtape by Mike Posner
 Matter of Time (Axium album), a 2002 album by Axium, or the title song
 Matter of Time (Meg Mac album), a 2022 album by Meg Mac

Songs
 "A Matter of Time" (Bec Cartwright song), 2003
 "A Matter of Time" (Sennek song), 2018 song that represented Belgium in the Eurovision Song Contest 2018
 "A Matter of Time", a song by The Killers from the album Battle Born
 "A Matter of Time", a song by The Foo Fighters from the album Wasting Light
"A Matter of Time", a song by Jukebox the Ghost from the album Let Live & Let Ghosts
 "Matter of Time", a song by Hellyeah from the album Hellyeah
 "Matter of Time", a song by Vanessa Carlton from Liberman

See also
 It's Just a Matter of Time (disambiguation)
 Just a Matter of Time  (disambiguation)
 The Matter of Time, an installation by the US sculptor Richard Serra